Lake Mohonk is a lake in Ulster County, New York, United States. Activities on the lake are operated by Mohonk Mountain House.

Description

Competitors in the Survival of the Shawangunks swim the lake as their final aquatic leg of the competition.

References

Sources

 

New Paltz, New York
Mohonk
Shawangunks
Mohonk
Hudson River School sites